Awaka is a relatively small town, situated on a small hill about four miles north-east of Owerri, capital city of Imo State, southeastern Nigeria. It is one of the towns that make host the Alaenyi clan, others include the surrounding Ihitta-Ogada, Egbu, Naze and Owere-Nchi-Ise.

Awaka shares borders with Umuorii Uratta, Ezeogba Emekuku and Umuawuka Emii. Popularly referred to as "Ancient Town", Awaka is largely known for corn production. The species of this tropical crop grown by Awaka people had been long held as distinct from other species with well arranged light yellow grains on a cob that fattens towards the base. Three villages make up Awaka, namely Nde-Egbelu, Umuodu and Amuzi. The town was ruled by His Royal Highness Eze Akujobi David-Osuagwu the Ezikoche II, beginning in the mid 1990s after a protracted tussle following the death of HRH Eze Chris David-Osuagwu (Ezikoche I).

Demographics 
Awaka people are predominantly Christian with a large presence of Roman Catholics and Anglican faithful who worship at the Holy Trinity Catholic Parish and the Christ's Anglican Church respectively.

Education 
Two primary schools, each close to one of the two major churches.

Facilities 
Awaka hosts a customary court and two privately owned hotels.

A legendary tree is found at the centre of one of the villages, Nde-Egbelu called the "ọbụ". This tree has a large trunk and is well researched by Prof ADW Acholonu in his autobiography.

Culture 
Traditionally, Awaka people celebrate Ịta Ọka, a day set aside to thank God for blessing the land with corn. Women prepare various delicacies with corn and entertain guests at their homes.

The villages have elected village heads. A system of organisation is based on age grades. The highest authority level is the Council of Elders (Nde Oha) comprising the eldest in each kindred, who must be conferred as an "Oha" by Oha Awaka Traditional Council.

Notables 
Notable natives include 

 Hon Justice Paschal Nnadi (a one-time chief judge of Imo State)
 Prof Alex D. Wozuzu Acholonu, OFR, educationist
 Dr Charles Nwanna Ejiogu (a UN diplomat)
 Attorney Chidi Charles Ejiogu
 Dr John Nnadi
 Chief Jerry Chukwueke
 Prof Cletus Emezi (formerly resident commissioner of electoral agency)
 Engr Uchenna Acholonu
 Barr Emeka Nwaneri
 Commodore Joel Ogazi rtd
 Pharmacist Ikenna Mbata
 Rev Fr Acholonu
 Dr Charles Obichere
 Engr Emeka Chukwueke

References

Towns in Imo State